Jumpshare is a visual communication platform that combines file sharing, screenshot capture, and screen recording in one app. It is available on Windows, MacOS, iOS, and Web app. Jumpshare uses a freemium business model: free accounts are offered with limited storage, while a paid subscription is available with expanded storage and sharing options.

History
The company was founded by Ghaus Iftikhar in October 2011. Initially, Jumpshare allowed guest users to upload and share files; signing up was later made mandatory. Jumpshare expanded the offering by introducing screenshot capture and video recording tools on August 19, 2015.

See also
 Cloud storage
 File sharing
 Comparison of file hosting services
 Comparison of file sharing applications
 Comparison of online backup services

References

External links
 

File sharing services
Cross-platform software